Ministry of Education (Arabic:  وزارة  التربية والتعليم) is a cabinet ministry of Yemen.

List of ministers 

 Tareq Salem al-Abkari (17 December 2020 – present)
 Abdulatef Hussein al-Hakimi (2014)

See also 

 Politics of Yemen

References 

Government ministries of Yemen